Katharina Hobgarski (born 18 June 1997) is a German tennis player.

So far, she has won 12 singles titles and 14 doubles titles on the ITF Circuit. On 9 January 2023, she reached her best singles ranking of world No. 189. On 3 April 2017, she peaked at No. 309 in the WTA doubles rankings.

In May 2016, Hobgarski was awarded a wildcard for the main draw of the Nuremberg Cup.

Singles performance timeline

Only main-draw results in WTA Tour (incl. Grand Slam tournaments) are included in win–loss records.

''Current through the 2023 Australian Open qualifying.

ITF Circuit finals

Singles: 23 (12 titles, 11 runner–ups)

Doubles: 16 (14 titles, 2 runner–ups)

Junior Grand Slam finals

Doubles: 1 (runner-up)

References

External links

 
 
 Official website 

1997 births
Living people
Sportspeople from Neunkirchen, Saarland
German female tennis players